Cetraxate (INN) is an oral gastrointestinal medication which has a cytoprotective effect.

References

Drugs acting on the gastrointestinal system and metabolism
Amines
Carboxylate esters
Propionic acids